Imperial Violets (French: Violettes impériales, Spanish: Violetas imperiales) is a 1952 French-Spanish historical musical film directed by Richard Pottier and starring Luis Mariano, Carmen Sevilla and Simone Valère. It is an operetta film, based on the 1948 stage work of the same title. The film's sets were designed by Léon Barsacq and the costumes by Marcel Escoffier and Jean Zay.

It was second most popular film released in France in 1952, attracting an audience of more than eight million.

Cast
 Luis Mariano as Juan de Ayala  
 Carmen Sevilla as Violetta  
 Simone Valère as Eugénie de Montijo
 Marie Sabouret as Mme. de Pierrefeu 
 Colette Régis as Mme de Montijo  
 Louis Arbessier as Napoleon III
 Micheline Francey as Clotilde  
 María Riquelme as Anaïs  
 Véra Norman as Mirette  
 Raymond Girard as Prosper Mérimée 
 Lucien Blondeau as Le grand chambellan
 Paul Faivre as L'aubergiste 
 Camille Guérini as Le docteur  
 René Hell as Le cocher  
 Angustias Albaicín 
 Rafael Arcos 
 Francisco Bernal 
 Jackie Blanchot 
 Joseph Chaumel 
 Aurora de Alba
 Lolita De Silva 
 Gil Delamare 
 Félix Fernández 
 Mateo Guitart 
 Maruja Heredia 
 Lucien Nat 
 Rafael Nogales 
 Raphaël Patorni
 Joaquín Pujol
 Manuel Requena
 Alfonso Rojas

See also
 Imperial Violets (1924)
 Imperial Violets (1932)

References

Bibliography 
 Hayward, Susan. French Costume Drama of the 1950s: Fashioning Politics in Film. Intellect Books, 2010.

External links 
 

1952 films
French historical musical films
Spanish historical musical films
1950s historical musical films
1950s French-language films
Films set in Paris
Films set in Seville
Films shot in Spain
Operetta films
Films based on operettas
Films directed by Richard Pottier
Films set in the 1850s
Remakes of French films
Spanish remakes of French films
Suevia Films films
French black-and-white films
Cultural depictions of Napoleon III
Films produced by Cesáreo González
1930s French films
1950s French films